Henri-Jacques-Guillaume Clarke, 1st Count of Hunebourg, 1st Duke of Feltre (17 October 1765 – 28 October 1818), born to Irish parents from Lisdowney, County Kilkenny, in Landrecies, was a politician and Marshal of France.

Clarke was one of the most influential and charismatic Franco-Irish generals in the French army during the Napoleonic period. He had close links to the Irish Brigade of France. His father served in Dillon's Regiment (where Clarke himself served for a time) and his mother's father and several uncles served in Clare's Regiment. With the outbreak of the French Revolution, Clarke served in the early French Revolutionary Wars in the Army of the Rhine, and by 1793 had been promoted to général de brigade. In 1795 Clarke was briefly arrested. After his release, Clarke lived in Alsace until Lazare Carnot sent him to Italy to serve as Napoleon Bonaparte's chief topographical officer, until he was sent to Sardinia. After 18 Brumaire, Clarke served as Chief of the Topographical Bureau, State Councillor, state secretary for the army and navy. During the war against Austria in 1805, Clarke was appointed governor of Vienna and during the war against Prussia in 1806 he served as governor of Erfurt and of Berlin.

Louis-Alexandre Berthier's position as both Chief of Staff and Minister of War proved overwhelming, and in 1807 Napoleon relocated the Ministry of War to Paris, naming Clarke to head it. Clarke quickly took control of the Ministry and began developing its authority, first by taking over the responsibilities of the Ministry of War Administration and then by encroaching upon other Ministries' administrative areas. His role in thwarting the British invasion of the Netherlands, the Walcheren Campaign in 1809, lead to the emperor creating him "Duke of Feltre" (extinguished in 1852 but extended in 1864). Napoleon came to depend on his authority and he was instrumental in organizing the administration and building the Grande Armée in 1811–1812. As chief military organizer, he claimed authority over conscription, the production of all military items, funding, and even health services. This led both to conflict with other Ministers and to an expansion of his own authority.

In 1812, when Claude François de Malet attempted his coup in Paris, Clarke saw an opportunity to expand his authority yet further. Anne Jean Marie René Savary, the Minister of Police and Clarke's main rival by 1812, was arrested by Malet and Clarke moved in to provide military police powers. Napoleon, however, was alarmed by Clarke's assumption of power in his absence and upon his return to Paris in December 1812 reappointed Savary. Although he needed Clarke's centralized Ministry in 1813, he never fully trusted Clarke after the Malet affair, and in November 1813 appointed an equally strong administrator, Pierre Daru, as Minister of War Administration. Daru began building his own authority, and during 1814 the army suffered as both Clarke and Daru sparred over administrative responsibilities and authority. As the Allies approached Paris, Clarke found himself with the responsibility to defend the capital but with split authority; not only was he charged with producing manpower for Napoleon, a duty he shared with Daru, but he was also responsible for the population and civil defense. He found himself organizing hospitals and mobilizing the population. In the end, his efforts at defense were ineffectual and he was one of the generals pressing for Napoleon's abdication. After Napoleon's abdication he was replaced as Minister of War by Dupont de l'Étang but Louis XVIII of France made him a Peer of France. When Napoleon landed in Southern France in March 1815 to reclaim his throne (the "Hundred Days"), Clarke was again made Minister of War and served until the Bourbon government fled. When the King fled to Ghent, Clarke followed him. After Napoleon's second abdication, Clarke was made Minister of War once more and served in that capacity until 1817 when Gouvion Saint-Cyr took over. He was then given command of the 15th Military Division.

In 1816 he was made a Marshal of France. Clarke died in 1818.

References

External links
 McGarry, S., Irish Brigades Abroad (Dublin, 2013)
 Spencer Napoleonica Collection  at Newberry Library

1765 births
1818 deaths
French people of Irish descent
People from Nord (French department)
Dukes of the First French Empire
French commanders of the Napoleonic Wars
Marshals of France
French Republican military leaders of the French Revolutionary Wars
Peers of France
French Ministers of War
Names inscribed under the Arc de Triomphe